The AAA World Tag Team Championship (Campeonato en Parejas AAA in Spanish) is the main tag team title contested for in the Mexican lucha libre promotion Lucha Libre AAA Worldwide (AAA). In 1993 AAA created the first version of the AAA World Tag team championship, technically the AAA/IWC (International Wrestling Council) World Tag Team titles. The belts used for the AAA/IWC titles were the old NWA Pacific Northwest Tag Team Championship belts. The original version was abandoned upon Art Barr's death in 1994. In 2007 AAA created a new World tag team title to replace the Comisión de Box y Lucha Libre Mexico D.F. controlled Mexican National Tag Team Championship. The titles are listed here separately as they share names but not lineage.

AAA/IWC World Tag Team Title history

AAA World Tag Team Title history

Combined reigns

By team

By wrestler

References

External links
AAA's official title history
 AAA World Tag Team Title History in English at Cagematch.net

Lucha Libre AAA Worldwide championships
Tag team wrestling championships
World professional wrestling championships